Rumman Raees (born 18 October 1991) is a Pakistani cricketer who plays for United Bank Limited and the Pakistan cricket team. In August 2018, he was one of thirty-three players to be awarded a central contract for the 2018–19 season by the Pakistan Cricket Board (PCB).

Personal life
The only brother of four sisters, he married in 2017.

Domestic and T20 franchise career
In October 2017, during the 2017–18 Quaid-e-Azam Trophy match between United Bank Limited and Lahore Whites, he took nine wickets for 25 runs in the second innings of the game. These were the second-best figures in first-class cricket in Pakistan.

On 3 June 2018, he was selected to play for the Toronto Nationals in the players' draft for the inaugural edition of the Global T20 Canada tournament. In March 2019, he was named in Federal Areas' squad for the 2019 Pakistan Cup.

International career
He was selected in Pakistan's squad for the 2016 ICC World Twenty20 tournament, but was dropped due to a knee injury. He made his Twenty20 International (T20I) debut for Pakistan against the West Indies on 27 September 2016.

Raees was initially not named in Pakistan's squad for the 2017 ICC Champions Trophy, but was added to the team as a replacement for the injured Wahab Riaz. He made his One Day International (ODI) debut in the semi-final against England on 14 June replacing the injured Mohammad Amir. He took two wickets for 44 runs including England's opener Alex Hales.

References

External links
 

1991 births
Living people
Pakistani cricketers
Pakistan One Day International cricketers
Pakistan Twenty20 International cricketers
United Bank Limited cricketers
Cricketers from Karachi
Islamabad United cricketers
Karachi Blues cricketers
Karachi cricketers
Saint Lucia Kings cricketers
Sindh cricketers